Sister Luise Radlmeier, O.P., was a German religious sister who was led a movement to care for the victims of the military conflicts in central Africa.

Life
Radlmeier was born in Pfeffenhausen, Bavaria, in 1937. She joined the Dominican Order in 1956. In 1957 she was sent to Africa where she has worked with the Dominican missions in Zimbabwe, Zambia and Kenya. Several years later she returned briefly to Europe where she received a graduate degree at the Sorbonne before returning to Africa to teach Religious Studies.

In 1987, while teaching in Nairobi, Radlmeier's attention was drawn by the growing number of young refugees fleeing the Second Sudanese War who came to the Dominican Sisters' convent seeking relief. Drawn to their plight, she began to provide education for these refugees, placing them in local schools, as well as food and housing.

Radlmeier expanded her efforts by 1990, as young Sudanese fled to Nairobi from the desperate conditions in the refugee camp at Kakuma, nearly 700 kilometers to the north. She raised funds to provide hundreds with basic and vocational primary and secondary education. By the late 1990s, she was supporting the education of nearly 800 Sudanese each year.

In 2002, Radlmeier left her teaching position to tend full-time to the needs of young Sudanese refugees and begin building the Emmanuel Foundation. She currently runs the Emmanuel Foundation from her compound in Juja Kenya. The Emmanuel Foundation serves the neediest Kenyans and African war refugees. Their programs include several schools, dormitories, three homes for AIDS and war orphans, a working farm, a home for the elderly and a modest hospital. Her work is supported by donations from Caritas Austria, the Christian Foundation for Children and the Aging in Kansas, Jewish organizations in Colorado, the Mennonite Central Committee, from her home parish in Pfeffenhausen, Germany and through her website.

Radlmeier died on March 12, 2017, in Nairobi, Kenya.

Lost Boys and Girls of Sudan
By the late 1990s, Radlmeier had built a center in Juja, north of Nairobi, to receive young people from the increasingly desperate conditions at Kakuma, and to offer a refuge for children orphaned by the war. She began working with the Joint Voluntary Agency, operated by the Church World Service to prepare young Sudanese for the interviews that were necessary to establish their refugee status so they could emigrate to the US, Canada and Australia. Many of the Lost Boys of Sudan, as well as a handful of Lost Girls, who have been aided by Sister Luise are living around the world.

Honors and awards

 In 2006, Radlmeier was awarded the Wallenberg Medal by the University of Michigan.

References
Sister Luise Radlmeier's biography on the website of the Dominican Sisters' Emmanuel Foundation

1937 births
People from Landshut (district)
Dominican Sisters
Dominican scholars
2017 deaths
Dominican missionaries
German Roman Catholic missionaries
Roman Catholic missionaries in Zimbabwe
20th-century German Roman Catholic nuns
Lost Boys of Sudan
University of Paris alumni
Recipients of the Raoul Wallenberg Award
Roman Catholic missionaries in Zambia
Roman Catholic missionaries in Kenya
Female Roman Catholic missionaries
Missionary educators
German expatriates in Zimbabwe
German expatriates in Kenya
German expatriates in Zambia